The August Faction Incident, officially called the "Second Arduous March", was an attempted removal of Kim Il-sung from power by leading North Korean figures from the Soviet-Korean faction and the Yan'an faction, with support from the Soviet Union and China, at the 2nd Plenary Session of the 3rd Central Committee of the Workers' Party of Korea (WPK) in 1956. The attempt to remove Kim failed and the participants were arrested and later executed. Through this political struggle, Kim Il-sung quashed all opposition to him within the central party leadership.

Background 
Kim Il-sung sent out preliminary signals in late 1955 and early 1956, before the 3rd Congress of the Workers' Party of Korea (WPK), that he was preparing to move against the Yan'an and Soviet factions. The 20th Congress of the Communist Party of the Soviet Union was a bombshell with Nikita Khrushchev's Secret Speech denouncing Joseph Stalin and the inauguration of de-Stalinization. Throughout the Soviet Bloc domestic Communist parties inaugurated campaigns against personality cults and the general secretaries who modelled themselves after Stalin were deposed throughout Eastern Europe.

Kim Il-sung was summoned to Moscow for six weeks in the summer of 1956 in order to receive a dressing down from Khrushchev, who wished to bring North Korea in line with the new orthodoxy. During Kim Il-sung's absence, Pak Chang-ok (the new leader of the Soviet faction after the suicide of Ho Ka-i), Choe Chang-ik, and other leading members of the Yan'an faction devised a plan to attack Kim Il-sung at the next plenum of the Central Committee and criticise him for not "correcting" his leadership methods, developing a personality cult, distorting the "Leninist principle of collective leadership" his "distortions of socialist legality" (i.e. using arbitrary arrest and executions) and use other Khrushchev-era criticisms of Stalinism against Kim Il-sung's leadership.

Political struggle 
Kim Il-sung became aware of the plan upon his return from Moscow and responded by delaying the plenum by almost a month. When the plenum finally opened on August 30 Choe Chang-ik made a speech attacking Kim Il-sung for concentrating the power of the party and the state in his own hands as well as criticising the party line on industrialisation which ignored widespread starvation among the North Korean people. Yun Kong-hum attacked Kim Il-sung for creating a "police regime". Kim Il-sung's supporters heckled and berated the speakers rendering them almost inaudible and destroying their ability to persuade members. Kim Il-sung's supporters accused the opposition of being "anti-Party" and moved to expel Yun Kong-hum from the party. Kim Il-sung, in response, neutralised the attack on him by promising to inaugurate changes and moderate the regime, promises which were never kept. The majority in the committee voted to support Kim Il-sung and also voted in favor of repressing the opposition, expelling Choe and Pak from the Central Committee.

A few leaders of the Yan'an faction fled to China to escape the purges that followed the August plenum, while supporters of the Soviet faction and Yan'an faction were rounded up. Though Kim Tu-bong, the leader of the Yan'an faction and nominal Chairman of the Standing Committee of the Supreme People's Assembly, was not directly involved in the attempt on Kim Il-sung, he was ultimately purged in 1958, accused of being the "mastermind" of the plot. Kim Tu-bong "disappeared" after his removal from power, and likely was either executed or died in prison.

In September 1956, a joint Soviet-Chinese delegation went to Pyongyang to instruct Kim Il-sung to cease any purge and reinstate the leaders of the Yan'an and Soviet factions. A second plenum of the Central Committee, held on September 23, 1956, officially pardoned the leaders of the August opposition attempt and rehabilitated them, but in 1957 the purges resumed, and, by 1958, the Yan'an faction had ceased to exist. Members of the Soviet faction, meanwhile, facing increased harassment, decided to return to the Soviet Union in increasing numbers.

By 1959, the purges had been so ravaging that more than a quarter of seats in the Supreme People's Assembly were vacant. A special by-election had to be organized in July that year.

By 1961, the only faction left was Kim Il-sung's own Guerrilla faction, along with members who had joined the WPK under Kim Il-sung's leadership and were loyal to him. In the 1961 Central Committee, there were only two members of the Soviet faction, three members of the Yan'an faction and three members of the Domestic faction left out of a total Central Committee membership of 68. These individuals were personally loyal to Kim Il-sung and were trusted by him; however, by the late 1960s, even these individuals were almost all purged.

One likely reason for the failure of the Soviet and Yan'an factions to depose Kim Il-sung was the nationalist view by younger members of the party who had joined since 1950 that the members of these factions were "foreigners" influenced by alien powers while Kim Il-sung was seen as a true Korean.

According to Kim Il-sung's biographer, Dae-Sook Suh: "[Kim Il-sung]'s long struggle to consolidate power was complete ... There were no longer any factions to challenge his position, and, for the first time, no foreign armed forces were occupying the North".

See also 

History of North Korea
Kapsan Faction Incident

References

Citations

Sources

Further reading

1956 in North Korea
History of the Workers' Party of Korea
Coup d'état attempts in Asia
Kim Il-sung
Purges in North Korea
Political and cultural purges